This article details the international fixtures and results of the Philippines Olympic football team.  All scores prior to 1991.

Fixtures and results (2020–present)

2022

2021

Fixtures and results (2010–2019)

2019

2017

2016

2015

2013

2011

Fixtures and results (2000–2009)

2005

Fixtures and results (1990–1999)

1999

1991

References

Under-23 association football